"How Long"  is a song recorded and produced by American singer-songwriter Charlie Puth. He wrote the song with Jacob Kasher and DJ Frank E. It was released on October 5, 2017, by Atlantic Records as the second single from Puth's second studio album, Voicenotes (2018). Commercially, it has reached the top 10 in Belgium, Israel, Lebanon, Malaysia, the Philippines, Scotland, and the United Kingdom as well as the top 20 in Australia, Belgium, Denmark, Ireland, the Netherlands, New Zealand, Slovakia, Spain, and Switzerland. The song peaked at number 21 on the US Billboard Hot 100.

Background
Puth teased the song in September 2017 on social media. He tweeted two photos in a row, which were captioned "how" and "long" respectively. In October 2017, he posted photos and video clips with the captions, "has", "this", "been" and "going". On October 4, 2017, he posted a video of the voice note recording behind the song with the caption "on", eventually spelling out "how long has this been going on" altogether, as one of the lines in the song's lyrics.

Composition
The song is composed in the key of C♯ minor with a tempo of 108-112 beats per minute.

Critical reception
Chris Malone of Billboard felt the song "opens with a slinky bassline 'Attention'", featuring a catchy chorus and representing "a slight stylistic shift from the more straight forward pop sound that filled his debut album Nine Track Mind", and that Puth took "the funkier R&B-leaning direction" with "How Long". James Dinh of iHeartRadio deemed it "a fitting follow-up to 'Attention' as the 25-year-old tackles yet another vulnerable narrative from the romance department", and expected it to enter the top 10 on the Billboard Hot 100. Mike Wass of Idolator wrote that the song "picks up where 'Attention' left off". He described the song as "instantly addictive and could well turn out to be an even bigger hit". Katrina Rees of CelebMix regarded the song as "Charlie's latest infectious offering", and wrote that it "has a slick yet fairly stripped back vibe which showcases the singer's vocal range".

Chart performance
"How Long" reached the top 10 on seven charts, including the UK Singles Chart. It debuted at number 60 on the Billboard Hot 100 on the week of October 28, 2017. It eventually peaked at number 21, holding that position for five consecutive weeks. On April 3, 2018, the single was certified platinum by the Recording Industry Association of America (RIAA) for sales of a million digital copies in the United States.

Music video 
The official music video was released on October 19, 2017, on Charlie Puth's official YouTube channel. It features Puth dancing in the street, walking on walls and defying gravity.. The music video has over 650 million views as of April 2022.

Live performances 
Puth performed the song live for the first time on Sounds Like Friday Night on October 27, 2017. He later performed the song live on The Late Late Show with James Corden on November 29, 2017.

Track listing

Charts

Weekly charts

Year-end charts

Certifications

Release history

References

2017 singles
2017 songs
Atlantic Records singles
Charlie Puth songs
Funk songs
Songs written by Charlie Puth
Songs written by DJ Frank E
Songs written by Jacob Kasher